The Burning Season is a documentary about the burning of rainforests in Indonesia which premiered at the Tribeca Film Festival in 2008. The main characters featured in the film are: Dorjee Sun from Australia; Achmadi, a small-scale palm oil farmer from Jambi province in Indonesia; and Lone Drøscher Nielsen, a Danish conservationist based in Kalimantan, Indonesia.

Synopsis
Every year, there is a burning season in Indonesia. Areas of rainforest the size of Denmark are cut down and set alight by farmers and corporations to develop palm oil plantations. As well as destroying the habitat of critically endangered orangutans, new scientific evidence shows that deforestation comprises 20% of global carbon emissions, contributing significantly to climate change.

A 30-year-old Australian environmental entrepreneur, Dorjee Sun, sets out to find a solution. Using expertise gained during the dot-com boom, Dorjee forms a small carbon-trading firm and signs up three pioneering Indonesian governors to partner in his venture. His idea involves selling the carbon credits represented by large forest areas in Aceh and Papua to big carbon emitters in the West. Despite the scepticism surrounding carbon trading, Dorjee's quest for a 'big deal' takes him from Sydney to New York, Washington DC, San Jose, San Francisco and London.

Meanwhile, another burning season is underway.  Achmadi, a small-scale Indonesian farmer, sets fire to his newly acquired piece of forest to clear it for palm oil. But he too has to face up to the impact of his burning on the global climate. And in Borneo, Danish-born Lone Drøscher-Nielsen rescues and cares for orangutans injured or orphaned by the fires. As she prepares for the release of rehabilitated orangutans back into the wild, the UN Climate Change Conference in Bali commences. Everything hinges on whether all the countries of the world can agree on the wording of a new climate change protocol and whether protection of forests will be included. As the drama of this historic moment plays out, Dorjee relentlessly pursues his deal. Is he a pioneer or a profiteer? What value does his concept offer to the remaining forests of the world and to the challenges of climate change?.

Production 
The film was updated in 2009 with a new ending which included the impacts of the global financial crisis and a meeting with California Governor Arnold Schwarzenegger. The film had a theatrical release in Australia and a digital release in the USA through FilmBuff. The DVD remains widely used in the education sector.

The production attracted philanthropic support through the Documentary Australia Foundation, including from an unnamed Melbourne family trust. Broadcast partners were ABC, BBC and CBC with National Geographic as distributor. Financial support was also provided by the Film Finance Corporation Australia, the NSW Film and TV Office and the Australian Film Commission. A total production budget of $755,529 was raised.

Executive Producer 
While Roger Graef is credited as the film's Executive Producer on the production's website, the post-roll credits on the Australian DVD release list him more specifically as the Executive Producer of the BBC version of the film.

Awards
Brisbane International Film Festival Audience Choice Award 2008 [Preview Cut]
Inside Film Award for Best Documentary
 nominated for an EMMY Award (Outstanding Documentary on a Business Topic)
 Producer/Director Cathy Henkel awarded SPAA (Screen Producer Association of Australia) Documentary Producer of the Year Award for her work on The Burning Season.

See also
Deforestation in Indonesia
Social and environmental impact of palm oil
Asian brown haze
 Rise of the Eco-Warriors (2014) Cathy Henkel's latest film, also about the forests of Indonesia.

References

External links
The Burning Season website

2008 films
Documentary films about environmental issues
Documentary films about forests and trees
Australian documentary films
Deforestation
Orangutans
Environmental issues in Indonesia
Orangutan conservation
2008 documentary films
2008 in the environment
Palm oil production in Indonesia
Documentary films about Indonesia
Southeast Asian haze
2000s English-language films